Willy Omer François Jean baron Coppens d'Houthulst DSO MC (6 July 1892 – 21 December 1986) was Belgium's leading fighter ace and the champion "balloon buster" of World War I. He was credited with 37 confirmed victories and six probables.

Early life
Coppens was born in Watermael-Boitsfort, son of Omer Coppens, a Belgian impressionistic painter who studied in the Royal Academy of Ghent. He was conscripted into the army in 1912, to serve with the Premiere Regiment Grenadiers.

World War I 

In 1914, following the German invasion of Belgium, Coppens transferred to The Motor Machine Gun Corps. On 6 September 1915, he signed up for flight training in the Compagnie des Aviateurs. Ultimately, due to insufficiencies in Belgian training, he took eight weeks of leave to train to fly. He and 39 other Belgians learned to fly on their own expense in Britain. He received his pilot's certificate on 9 December 1915. After this training in Britain he had further training at the Farman School in Étampes, France and joined the Sixieme Escradrille as a sergent 1st class (Sergeant First Class) on 8 April 1917 flying BE-2c two seaters. Later that month, he was assigned to Quatrieme Escadrille to fly a Farman pusher. On 1 May, he received a Sopwith 1½ Strutter two seater and promptly flew it into his first aerial combat.

In mid July, he transferred to the single seater fighter unit 1ère Escadrille de Chasse (1st Pursuit Squadron). He received the last remaining Nieuport 16 in the squadron; everyone else had upgraded to Nieuport 17s. When Hanriot HD.1s were offered to the squadron, he was the only pilot to initially accept one. His enthusiasm for the aircraft type prompted other pilots to also move over to Hanriots.

On 19 August Coppens was promoted to Adjutant. He continued his nervy but unsuccessful combat career against enemy aircraft until 17 March 1918. On that day he carried out his first attack on German observation balloons, as an aid to a ground assault by the Belgian Army. Though handicapped by lack of incendiary ammunition he punctured two balloons, causing the observers to bail out and the balloons to collapse to the ground.

Finally, on 25 April Coppens scored his first victory by downing a Rumpler two seater. On 8 May he finally found his metier, when he shot two balloons down in flames.

A week later, using his usual tactics of close range fire, Coppens cut a balloon loose from its ties. It bounced up beneath him and momentarily carried his Hanriot skyward. After his aircraft fell off the balloon, he restarted its engine and flew back to base. The balloon sagged into an explosion.

Later when on another attack run, he got shot at from a balloon. He parked his plane on top of the damaged balloon, shut down his engine in order to protect its propeller, and waited until the balloon descended to slide off the balloon and fly away.

From then on, Coppens' record was spectacular. Between April and October 1918 he was credited with destroying 34 German observation balloons and three airplanes, nearly as many victories as Belgium's other five aces combined. Unlike most fighter pilots of World War I, who used .303 caliber or 7.92 mm guns, Coppens used a larger bore 11 mm Vickers machine gun, having upgraded his weaponry prior to June 1918.

In June, he was promoted to sous lieutenant, thus becoming an officer. His royal blue plane with its insignia of a thistle sprig wearing a top hat became so well known that the Germans went to special pains to try to kill him. On 3 August he shot down a balloon booby-trapped with explosives that when detonated from the ground narrowly missed killing him. The flaming wreckage of the balloon "fell swift as doom on the watching [German] staff officers, killing many and injuring the rest".

On his last mission, 14 October, Coppens downed a balloon over Praatbos and was attacking one over Torhout when he was severely wounded by an incendiary bullet, smashing the tibia of his left leg and severing the artery. Coppens crash landed near Diksmuide and was taken to hospital, where his leg was amputated.

Coppens achieved all his victories flying a Hanriot HD.1 fighter.

After the war

For his wartime service he was knighted, becoming Willy Omer Francois Jean Coppens de Houthulst, for a forest in his squadron's operating area. He was decorated by Belgium, France, Britain, Portugal, Italy, Poland, and Serbia. His memoir, Days on the Wing, were published in 1931 and reissued in the 1970s as Flying in Flanders.

Between the two World Wars Coppens was Belgian air attaché to four nations. He retired to Switzerland in 1940, organising resistance work and marrying. In the late 1960s he returned to Belgium and lived his last five years with fellow Belgian ace Jan Olieslagers's only daughter until his death in 1986.

Title, arms and honours
Willy Coppens was created Knight Coppens d'Houthulst by King Albert in 1930.
In 1960, he was created Baron Coppens d'Houthulst by King Baudouin.
Willy Coppens got the (in Belgium) very exceptional honor to add 'd'Houthulst' after his noble title (meaning: of Houthulst), referring to a wood he often overflew during the First World War.
His arms consist of 3 silver flying eagles on a blue background.
His motto was 'Je surmonterai' (I will overcome).

Willy Coppens deemed honors and awards to be very important, as he felt they ought to be a token of recognition. In his opinion, they should not be granted automatically and he felt it was injust that lower ranking frontline servicemen received lower ranks in national orders than commanding generals that did not participate in active combat.
This feeling was made tangible in 1959 and 1968 when he refused the Commander's cross in the order of Leopold as a civilian pilot who deserted the 'Compagnie des aviateurs' on the 23 of August 1914, after only 20 days of service received the Grand Officer's cross of the same order, a higher rank than the Commander's cross offered to him.

 Commander of the order of the crown with swords
 Commander of the order of the Leopold II with swords
 Officer of the order of Leopold
 War cross WWI with 27 palms and 13 bronze lions
 Yser cross
 Fire cross
 WWI Victory medal
 WW I commemorative medal
 Military cross, second class
 Commemorative medal of the 100 anniversary of the national independence
 Grand officer of the order of Ouissam Alaouite (Morocco)
 Grand officer of the order of Nichan-Iftikhar (Tunisia)
 Commander of the legion of honor (France)
 Commander of the order of the black star (Benin)
 Commander of the order of Isabella the catholic (Spain)
 Officer of the order of the white eagle (Poland)
 Officer of the order of saint Maurice and Lazarus (Italy)
 Virtuti Military, Knight (Poland)
 Distinguished Service Order (United Kingdom)
 Military Cross (United Kingdom)
 Silver medal for military valor (Italy)
 War cross WWI with 2 palms (France)
 War cross with golden cross and palm (Portugal)
 War merit cross (Italy)
 War cross WWI (Poland)
 5 front bars
 1 wound bar

See also
 List of World War I aces from Belgium

Footnotes

References
 Norman Franks, Russell Guest, & Gregory Alegi (1997).  Above the War Fronts. Grub Street, London.
 First World War Who's Who
Willy Omer François Jean Coppens de Houthulst, The Aerodrome - Aces and Aircraft of World War I
Jon Gutman and Harry Dempsey (2005) Balloon-Busting Aces of World War 1 (Aircraft of the Aces)
Pieters, Walter M. (1998). Above Flanders' Fields. Grub Street (London).

External links
"theaerodrome.com", a full list of Coppens' victories

1892 births
1986 deaths
People from Watermael-Boitsfort
Aviation in World War I
Belgian World War I flying aces
Commanders of the Order of the Crown (Belgium)
Commanders of the Order of Leopold II
Recipients of the Military Cross
Recipients of the Croix de guerre (Belgium)
Recipients of the Croix de Guerre 1914–1918 (France)
Commandeurs of the Légion d'honneur
Companions of the Distinguished Service Order
Recipients of the Order of Isabella the Catholic
Officers of the Order of Saints Maurice and Lazarus
Knights of the Virtuti Militari
Recipients of the Silver Medal of Military Valor
Recipients of the Cruz de Guerra
Recipients of the War Cross for Military Valor